Bhavanji Arjun Khimji, JP (28 July 1902 - 1970) was member of Indian National Congress, who served as a member of Indian parliament (lower house) twice from Kachchh (Lok Sabha constituency). He was a member of Bombay Legislative Assembly from 1937 to 1951. Khimji also served as treasurer of All India Congress Committee. He was jailed for taking part in the freedom struggle in India from 1931–32, 1940–41 and 1942-44. He was born in Khamgaon in a Jain family and inherited family run Khimji Ginning & Pressing Company, which was located in Khamgaon.

References

External links 
 Biography: Bhagwanji Arjan Khimji

1902 births
India MPs 1952–1957
India MPs 1957–1962
Lok Sabha members from Maharashtra
Indian independence activists from Maharashtra
Indian National Congress politicians from Maharashtra
Indian National Congress politicians from Gujarat
Politicians from Mumbai
Maharashtra politicians
Prisoners and detainees of British India
Indian independence activists from Gujarat
1970 deaths
Members of the Bombay State Legislative Assembly
Indian businesspeople in textiles
Indian justices of the peace
People from Buldhana district
Members of the Constituent Assembly of India